The 1918 Auckland Rugby League season was its 10th since its inception in 1909. It was again severely affected by the ongoing war with several hundred players serving overseas and 44 killed who were named in the annual report. North Shore Albions withdrew from the competition early in the season and on other occasions teams played short-handed. There was also a truncated representative program with only a trial match and one full Auckland representative match versus Canterbury, which was played at the Auckland Domain in front of 10,000 spectators.

The senior grade featured six teams. Ponsonby United won their second consecutive title with an 8-win–1-loss record. Ponsonby then travelled to Christchurch to play Sydenham for the Thacker Shield and they won 11 points to 0. City Rovers won their second Roope Rooster title with a 6–3 win over Maritime following their first win in 1916.

Senior games still regularly attracted strong crowds. The round 4 matches at Victoria Park drew an estimated crowd of 6,000. While 4,000 attended the round 5 matches, 5,000 the round 7 clash between City Rovers and Grafton Athletic at the same venue, and 6,000 witnessed the round 9 match between City Rovers and Ponsonby United.

At the season end many one-off matches were played between various teams. One of the more notable ones was a match between the Auckland Star staff and The New Zealand Herald staff. The game was won by the Auckland Star by 8 points to 4. These company type fixtures were to become a regular feature of Auckland Rugby League for decades to come.

Competition news

Maritime, Mangere, and Big Store football clubs form 
The 'Maritime Football Club' applied to join the Auckland Rugby League with the nomination of a senior team. This was accepted by the league. They finished the season with a 1 win, 7 loss record.

The Mangere club applied for affiliation and the registration of 23 players at the Auckland Rugby League meeting on 17 April. This was granted by the league. They were to play in maroon and gold originally as requested but before the season started asked to wear blue instead.

The Big Store Football Club nominated a team to play in the league which was accepted and their colours of blue and white were approved.

New league rooms 
At the conclusion of the season the league opened their own league rooms on Swanson Street. The rooms were used for the first time with the Auckland Rugby League executive meeting on 23 October. The rooms consisted of "a large billiard room and League office, and a room for clubs to hold their weekly meetings in". It was stated that players did not formerly meet "their fellow players during the summer time, but with this club now on a sound footing they will be able to meet each other and spend enjoyable evenings which should bring about a better feeling between the different teams".

Death of George Cook in World War 1
On January 14, 1918 George Cook died in France during World War 1. Originally he was a rugby player who played for many seasons for Horowhenua before moving to Wellington where he played representative rugby there too. He switched to rugby league in 1912 playing for Wellington and there gaining selection for New Zealand to play New South Wales. Cook moved to Auckland in 1913 and joined the Newton Rangers. He played in 9 matches for them and scored 33 points making him the second highest scorer. He was selected for Auckland and played in 6 matches scoring 4 tries. In 1914 he joined the Otahuhu Rovers club where he played 9 games and scored 29 points which was the 3rd most in the competition. Cook enlisted in the New Zealand Māori (Pioneer) Battalion in 1917. Cook died on October 12, 1918, from Broncho-pneumonia while at the No. 7 Canadian General Hospital in the field in France. He was buried at Étaples Military Cemetery in Étaples, near Boulogne in north-west France.

Representative match 
Auckland played a representative match for the first time in a few seasons. They had taken a hiatus during the war years but they played a trial match between and A and B team before a match with Canterbury at the Auckland Domain. The match attracted an enormous crowd of 10,000 and Auckland won easily by 45 points to 9.

First grade championship
The 1st grade championship had been competing for the Myers Cup from 1910 to 1914 but after the beginning of the war the league decided to not award trophies though the grade competitions were still competed for as normal. The season began with 3 preliminary rounds before the competitions began proper on 18 May. Around 5,000 spectators attended the first round matches at Victoria Park and Devonport Domain. North Shore Albions played the preliminary rounds, round 1, and defaulted their next two matches before withdrawing from the competition.

Teams
The competition featured 6 teams.
City Rovers (red and black)
Grafton Athletic (black and white)
Maritime (red, white, and blue)
Newton Rangers (red and white)
North Shore Albions (green and white)
Ponsonby United (blue and black)

Preliminary rounds

Round 1

Round 2
North Shore was struggling to field a team owing to the impact of the war on their playing numbers. They only managed 11 players for their match with Maritime who were also fielding a weakened forward pack.

Round 3
North Shore defaulted their match with Grafton. Ponsonby achieved a milestone of sorts becoming the first club to reach 1,000 first grade points during their match with Newton. They began the game with 983 points all time and progressed to 1,004 by the end of the match. It had taken them 72 matches to reach the mark.

First Grade standings
{|
|-
|

Ponsonby and Maritime both had default wins over North Shore Albions. Newton had a default win over Maritime (R9). These results are included in the standings.

First Grade results

Round 1

Round 2
North Shore lost by default to Maritime. In the City v Grafton match the City player Mitchell was ordered off by referee Vause for disputing a decision. He wrote a letter of apology during the week and the league ordered him to appear on Saturday to receive a “severe citation”

Round 3
North Shore once again defaulted and the withdrew from the first grade competition leaving 5 teams.

Round 4

Round 5
Sheehan was ordered off for Maritime in their match with Ponsonby for striking Matthews.

Round 6

Round 7
Remarkably the match between Newton and Ponsonby at the Domain was recorded with footage of the game surviving and being archived on The New Zealand Archive of Film, Television and Sound Ngā Taonga website.

Round 8

Round 9

Round 10

On 21 September a match was played between the Auckland Rugby League referees and officials of the league. The referees won by 14 points to 4 with it being refereed by Jim Rukutai.

Roope Rooster knockout competition

Round 1

Semi final

Final

Top try scorers and point scorers
The following point scoring lists include both Senior Championship matches (including preliminary rounds) and the Roope Rooster competition. For the 5th time in 6 seasons Karl Ifwersen topped the point scoring lists with 66 points. This gave him 287 points from 6 seasons. While Eric McGregor (brother of Kiwi Dougie McGregor) of Ponsonby United topped the try scoring list with 10. Newton Rangers had 4 tries and 2 conversions unattributed while Ponsonby had 1 try unattributed which make the point lists for those teams slightly incomplete.

Thacker Shield
Ponsonby United travelled south to Christchurch to play a match with Sydenham for the Thacker Shield. They were victorious and brought the shield to Auckland.

Lower grade clubs
The lower grades featured teams in the 2nd grade (5), 3rd grade (5), 4th grade (9), 5th grade (11), and 6th grade (4).

A team named "Big Store" was entered in the 5th grade competition. They were essentially a company team representing George Court & Sons. Their motto at the time was "Big Store" in reference to its range of goods in their Karangahape Road store. During the season they asked the Auckland Rugby League if they could be affiliated to the Newton Rangers club. The league delayed a decision as they had earlier asked to be affiliated to the City Rovers club before changing their mind. The affiliation with Newton was later affirmed. The team was however thrown out of the competition after an incident in a match in early August. They were suspended until the end of the following (1919 season), and their captain, Crawley was suspended for 3 seasons.

Second grade
While fixtures were reported in the newspapers each week there were only 2 scores reported in the entire season along with 1 other result (City defeating Mangere in round 1). This renders the standings below to be extremely inaccurate. Grafton withdrew after round 1, while Ponsonby withdrew after round 7. Otahuhu won the championship.
{|
|-
|

Third grade
North Shore won the championship. There were only 11 scores reported from 26 scheduled matches.
{|
|-
|

Fourth grade
Telegraph Messengers won the championship, sealing it on September 7 with a 15-2 win over Newton. Parnell, Manukau, and Otahuhu all withdrew from the competition after round 9. Ponsonby withdrew 1 round later. There were 23 scores reported and 23 unreported.
{|
|-
|

Fifth grade
Otahuhu won the championship after defeating City in the final on September 14. Telegraph Messengers, Manukau B, and Ponsonby B all withdrew after 11 rounds, while Manukau A and Northcote & Birkenhead Ramblers withdrew a week later. Big Store was removed from the competition by the ARL due to a disciplinary issue in an August match. They were suspended until the end of 1919 but failed to ever take part in Auckland Rugby League again. 23 scores were reported, with 34 scores not reported.
{|
|-
|

Sixth grade
City won the championship. There were 23 results reported and 23 not reported.

Auckland Rugby League seasons
Auckland Rugby League